Paolo Viganò (February 11, 1950 in Seregno – May 22, 2014) was an Italian professional football player.

References

1950 births
2014 deaths
People from Seregno
Italian footballers
Serie A players
Juventus F.C. players
A.S. Roma players
A.C. Monza players
Palermo F.C. players
Brescia Calcio players
Novara F.C. players
Association football defenders
Footballers from Lombardy
Sportspeople from the Province of Monza e Brianza